The Albigna Glacier (Lombard: vadret da l'albigna) is a 3.5 km long glacier (2005) situated in the Bregaglia Range in the canton of Graubünden in Switzerland. In 1973 it had an area of 3.53 km2.

See also
List of glaciers in Switzerland
Swiss Alps

External links
Swiss glacier monitoring network

Glaciers of the Alps
Glaciers of Graubünden
Bregaglia